Jonathan Nelson may refer to:

 Jonathan Nelson (American football) (born 1988), American football safety
 Jonathan Nelson (singer), American gospel singer-songwriter
 Jonathan Nelson, American founder of Organic, Inc.
 Jonathan M. Nelson (born 1956), founder of Providence Equity Partners

See also
Jon Nelson (disambiguation)
John Nelson (disambiguation)
Nelson (surname)